Ronelda Kamfer (born 1981 in Blackheath, near Cape Town ) is an Afrikaans-speaking South African poet.

Life 
She grew up with her grandparents, farm workers in Grabouw, in a region known for its orchards and vineyards, located a good sixty kilometers from Cape Town and its townships. She then returned to her parents, who, when she was 13, settled in Eersterivier,  a suburb which had many social problems - poverty, violence, drugs, gang warfare. This experience profoundly marked her life and her writing.

She gained a bachelor's degree in 1999; she held various jobs: waitress, office worker, nurse, while writing and pursuing studies at the University of the Western Cape, where she obtained a Master of Letters (Afrikaans and Dutch ).

Ronelda Kamfer published first poems in anthologies and magazines in South Africa and the Netherlands. Among the authors whose influence, she mentions Derek Walcott, Charles Bukowski and Antjie Krog.

Ronelda Kamfer is married to poet and comic-strip creator Nathan Trantraal; they have one child.

Awards 
In 2009, Ronelda Kamfer won - with Loftus Marais - Eugene Marais prize (Eugene Maraisprys) awarded by the South African Academy.
In 2016, she was awarded the Jan Rabie en Marjorie Wallace-writers prize.

Works 
(now that the dog is sleeping)

Poems in journals
 Missives n° 253, Littératures d'Afrique du Sud, juin 2009, Paris
 Confluences Poétiques n° 4, avril 2011, Paris
 Po&sie n° 143, juin 2013, Éditions Belin, Paris
 Zone sensible n°1, juin 2014, "Poésie et événement", Biennale internationale des poètes en Val-de-Marne, Ivry 
Poèmes in anthologies
 Denise Coussy, Denis Hirson et Joan Metelerkamp, Afrique du Sud - Une traversée littéraire, Philippe Rey Éditeur, collection Cultures Sud, Paris 2011
 Poésie au cœur du monde, Biennale Internationale des Poètes en Val-de-Marne, juin 2013
 Pas de blessure, pas d'histoire: Poèmes d'Afrique du Sud 1996-2013, édition dirigée par Denis Hirson, Bacchanales n° 50, Maison de la poésie Rhône-Alpes, 2013

in English 
Extracts from two collections of poems Ronelda Kamfer, Charl JF Cilliers translated, are included in the online anthology of contemporary Afrikaans poetry titled In a burning sea - Contemporary Afrikaans poetry in translation.

Reception 
Burger's critique places Kamfer's use of the water as a literary device within the context of other South African poets, such as Koleka Putuma.

References

External links 
 Critique du Poetry International Web – South Africa, par Charl-Pierre Naudé.
 
 http://www.kwela.com/authors/5797
 Ronelda S. Kamfer, writer in residence in Amsterdam on YouTube
 

South African writers
21st-century South African poets
South African women poets
Afrikaans-language writers
1981 births
Living people
21st-century South African women writers